Pasadena is an American prime time soap opera that originally aired on Fox from September to November 2001.

Summary
The series starred Alison Lohman as Lily McAllister, an initially naïve young woman who witnesses a stranger's suicide and begins to investigate the secrets being hidden by her own very wealthy California family, the Greeleys. Other cast members included Dana Delany and Martin Donovan as Lily's parents, Will and Catherine McAllister, and  Chris Marquette as Lily's brother Mason. Mark Valley, Balthazar Getty, and Natasha Gregson Wagner portrayed Catherine's siblings Robert, Nate, and Beth Greeley, while Philip Baker Hall and Barbara Babcock played Greeley patriarch and matriarch George and Lillian. Alan Simpson was cast as Lily's love interest Henry Bellow, with Derek Cecil as Henry's brother Tom.

Cast

Alison Lohman as Lily McAllister
Alan Simpson as Henry Bellow
Martin Donovan as Will McAllister
Dana Delany as Catherine McAllister
Chris Marquette as Mason McAllister
Natasha Gregson Wagner as Beth Greeley
Mark Valley as Robert Greeley
Nicole Paggi as Jennie Bradbury 
Balthazar Getty as Nate Greeley

Production
Pasadena was created by Mike White, who attended elementary and high school in Pasadena, California. Actress/director Diane Keaton directed the pilot episode, and was among the show's executive producers. Other producers included Mark B. Perry, Dana Baratta, R. W. Goodwin, and Bill Robinson. The pilot was edited by Tatiana S. Riegel.

Episodes

Release

Broadcast and syndication 
Only four episodes were originally aired in the U.S. in 2001, though thirteen were filmed, with the last episode seemingly resolving the central mystery of the series. In late 2005, the series was shown in its entirety for the first time in the United States, on the cable channel SoapNet.

In 2003 and 2004, all thirteen episodes were aired in various countries such as Romania (by the public television TVR 1), Bulgaria (BTV Channel), Colombia, Croatia, México, Serbia, Slovakia, New Zealand, Finland, Denmark, Russia, South Africa (on the pay channel M-Net), Israel (on cable Channel 3) and China. It began airing in Belgium on Club RTL on June 27, 2010.

Home media 
Mill Creek Entertainment announced the series on DVD.

Reception 
Although the show was critically acclaimed, it was watched by only 4.3 million viewers. The general speculation at the time was that, with the series having premiered two weeks after the September 11, 2001 attacks, American audiences were not willing to watch a show like Pasadena, with its dark atmosphere and cynical storylines.

References

External links
 

2001 American television series debuts
2001 American television series endings
2000s American drama television series
2000s American mystery television series
American primetime television soap operas
English-language television shows
Fox Broadcasting Company original programming
Television series created by Mike White
Television series by Sony Pictures Television
Television shows set in Los Angeles